The FIL World Luge Championships 1979 took place in Königssee, West Germany for a record fourth time. Königssee had hosted the event previously in 1969, 1970, and 1974. The track also hosted the bobsleigh world championships that same year, the first time that had ever happened in both bobsleigh and luge in a non-Winter Olympic year (Igls hosted both bobsleigh and luge events at the 1976 games held in neighboring Innsbruck.).

Men's singles

Women's singles

Men's doubles

Medal table

References
Men's doubles World Champions
Men's singles World Champions
Women's singles World Champions

FIL World Luge Championships
1979 in luge
1979 in German sport
Luge in Germany